This is a list of mountains in the U.S. state of Vermont.

List

Gallery

Mount Mansfield photos

Killington Peak photos

Camel's Hump Mountain Photos

Woodbury Mountain Photos

See also 
List of mountains of the Appalachians

References

AMC NE 4000 Footer List

Vermont
Mountains
Vermont